The America Zone was one of the two regional zones of the 1954 Davis Cup.

7 teams entered the America Zone, with the winner going on to compete in the Inter-Zonal Final against the winner of the Europe Zone. The United States defeated Mexico in the final, and went on to face Sweden in the Inter-Zonal Final.

Draw

Quarterfinals

Caribbean/West Indies vs. United States

Mexico vs. Japan

Canada vs. Chile

Semifinals

United States vs. Cuba

Mexico vs. Canada

Final

Mexico vs. United States

References

External links
Davis Cup official website

Davis Cup Americas Zone
America Zone
Davis Cup